The Friscoville Street Historic District, in Arabi, Louisiana in St. Bernard Parish, Louisiana, is a  historic district which was listed on the National Register of Historic Places in 1998.  It included 76 contributing buildings.

It includes the 100-900 blocks of Friscoville Street, which was platted in 1906.  The district is mostly residential.  Besides houses, there are a church, a historic jail, a small commercial building, a brick school, and former casino.  It includes Colonial Revival and Bungalow architecture plus scattered eclectic houses.

References

National Register of Historic Places in St. Bernard Parish, Louisiana
Colonial Revival architecture in Louisiana
Buildings and structures completed in 1906
1906 establishments in Louisiana